Charles Arthur Smith (born March 1, 1960) is an American chef who has worked for former Florida governors Bob Graham and Jeb Bush and until 2007 was personal chef to Oprah Winfrey. His expertise is Southern cuisine.

While attending Florida State University he completed culinary internships with The Greenbrier and the Walt Disney Magic Kingdom College Program.

Publications 
Smith  has authored three award-winning cookbooks: Back to the Table; Kitchen Life: Real Food for Real Families; and Back to the Family. He contributed recipes and cooking advice to The Spectrum, the newest book by cardiologist and New York Times bestselling author Dr. Dean Ornish.  He edits a monthly article on Oprah.com and contributes articles to O, The Oprah Magazine.  His latest cookbook, (released May 2013), Art Smith's Healthy Comfort, has a focus on healthy cooking and healthy living, (published by Harper One 2013).

Projects

Common Threads
Smith founded the non-profit charity Common Threads, which focuses on teaching children about different cultures through food and art. Common Threads has served over 750 children and served 2,000 healthy meals to children in 2006. He serves on the board of directors of “Kids Café”, a nutrition program, for children in Minneapolis. Smith owns and runs a highly successful restaurant in Chicago called TABLE fifty-two as well as Art and Soul in Washington, D.C. In 2009, Smith raised $10,000 for Common Threads as a participant on the television show Top Chef Masters, Season 1.

Events 
Smith has cooked for many celebrities and heads of state, including former President Barack Obama and the current King of Sweden.  In addition to being chef for Florida Governor Bob Graham, he cooked for Florida Governor Jeb Bush, Romero Britto, film stars Ali Landry and Eduardo Verástegui amongst many others. He has also appeared on Extreme Makeover: Home Edition.
Smith also appeared in a cooking segment in Lady Gaga's 2011 ABC special A Very Gaga Thanksgiving in which he and Gaga prepared a Thanksgiving meal of turkey and waffles. Months later, Smith became the head chef of Joanne Trattoria, an Italian restaurant in New York City owned by Lady Gaga's parents.
He was also a celebrity judge on the second seasons of the reality shows BBQ Pitmasters and Nailed It, as well as competing in the Chopped Season 24 All-Stars Tournament, advancing to the final round.

Awards 
 The 2002 James Beard Award for Back to the Table: The Reunion of Food and Family.
2001 Gourmand World Cookbook Award - Category, “For Human Values.”
Humanitarian of the Year, 2007, James Beard Foundation
In 2008 Art Smith was inducted into the Chicago Gay and Lesbian Hall of Fame.

Personal
Smith lives in Jasper, Florida with his husband, Jesus Salgueiro, a painter. The two married at the Lincoln Memorial in 2011, after being together 10 years. They donate their time to many causes, from children's cooking classes to humanitarian aid. He and his husband recently (as of 2018) adopted five children.

Shortly before his 50th birthday, Smith was diagnosed with diabetes. He later went on a diet, and lost 100 pounds. Smith now tries to eat six small meals a day. He has also completed many marathons.

References

External links
Common Threads

1960 births
Living people
People from Jasper, Florida
Chefs from Chicago
American male chefs
American food writers
LGBT people from Florida
James Beard Foundation Award winners
People with diabetes
21st-century LGBT people
LGBT chefs